Hoochie Cooche Man is a 1966 album by Jimmy Smith arranged by Oliver Nelson. The album title has also been spelled as Hoochie Coochie Man.

Reception

Billboard reviewed the album in their September 3, 1966 issue and wrote that "Only six cuts on the LP, but they're all blockbusters, blues based rousers...".

Track listing
 "I'm Your Hoochie Coochie Man" (Willie Dixon) – 6:00
 "One Mint Julep" (Rudy Toombs) – 5:30
 "Ain't That Just Like a Woman" (Claude Demetrius, Fleecie Moore) – 5:40
 "Boom Boom" (John Lee Hooker) – 6:12
 "Blues and the Abstract Truth" (Oliver Nelson) – 5:25
 "TNT" (Ben Tucker, Grady Tate) – 5:25

Personnel

Musicians
 Jimmy Smith – Hammond organ, vocals
 Oliver Nelson – arranger, conductor
 Richard Davis – double bass
 Bob Cranshaw – electric bass
 Bobby Rosengarden – bongos, percussion
 Grady Tate – drums
 Donald Corrado, Willie Ruff – French horn
 Barry Galbraith, Bill Suyker, Billy Butler, Kenny Burrell – guitar
 Buddy Lucas – harmonica
 Jack Agee, Jerome Richardson, Jerry Dodgion, Phil Woods, Bob Ashton – woodwind
 Britt Woodman, Melba Liston, Quentin Jackson, Tom McIntosh – trombone
 Ernie Royal, Gene Young, Joe Newman, Dick Williams – trumpet
 Don Butterfield – tuba

Technical
 Creed Taylor – producer
 Val Valentin – director of engineering
 Rudy Van Gelder – engineer
 Acy R. Lehman – cover design
 Chuck Stewart – photography

Chart performance

Album

Single

References

1966 albums
Albums arranged by Oliver Nelson
Albums produced by Creed Taylor
Albums recorded at Van Gelder Studio
Jimmy Smith (musician) albums
Verve Records albums